The Aerodyne Yogi is a series of French single-place, paragliders that was designed by Michel Le Blanc and produced by Aerodyne Technologies of Talloires.

Design and development
The Yogi was designed as a beginner glider for school, with the four models each named for their relative size. Compared to other beginner gliders it was designed to exhibit better progressive launch behaviour and require less physical launch effort. It rolls more easily upon brake applications and has better stability, all desirable traits for a training glider.

Variants
Yogi XS
Extra small-sized model for lighter pilots. The glider model is AFNOR St certified.
Yogi S
Small-sized model for lighter pilots. The glider model is AFNOR St certified.
Yogi M
Mid-sized model for medium-weight pilots. The glider model is AFNOR St certified.
Yogi L
Large-sized model for heavier pilots. The glider model is AFNOR St certified.

Specifications (Yogi M)

References

Yogi
Paragliders